"She Twerkin" (originally titled "The Twerk Song") is a song by American hip hop recording artist Cash Out. It was released on February 25, 2014, as the lead single for his debut studio album Let's Get It (2014). The song peaked at number 98 on the Billboard Hot 100, making it Cash Out's second overall Hot 100 entry. The official remix features Juicy J, Lil Boosie, Ty Dolla Sign and Kid Ink.

Chart performances

Weekly charts

Year-end charts

Certifications

References 

2014 singles
Cash Out songs
2014 songs
MNRK Music Group singles